Guth v. Loft Inc, 5 A.2d 503, 23 Del. Ch. 255 (Del. 1939) is a Delaware corporation law case, important for United States corporate law, on corporate opportunities and the duty of loyalty. It deviated from the year 1726 rule laid down in Keech v Sandford that a fiduciary should leave open no possibility of conflict of interest between his private dealings and the job he is entrusted to do.

Facts
Charles Guth was the president of Loft, Inc., a candy and syrup manufacturer, which served a cola drink at its fountain stores. Loft Inc's soda fountains purchased cola syrup from The Coca-Cola Company, but Guth decided it would be cheaper to buy from Pepsi after Coke declined to give him a larger jobber discount. Pepsi went bankrupt before Guth (and Loft Inc) could inquire about obtaining syrup from Pepsi. 

Guth then personally bought the Pepsi company and its syrup recipe. With the aid of Loft Inc chemists, he reformulated the recipe, and soon purported to sell the syrup to Loft Inc.

He was sued by Loft Inc's shareholders, who alleged that he breached his fiduciary duty of loyalty to the company by failing to offer that opportunity to Loft Inc, instead appropriating it for himself.

Judgment
The Delaware Supreme Court, Chief Justice Daniel J. Layton, held that Guth had breached his fiduciary duties to Loft Inc, by taking an opportunity that the company was interested in, and could itself have exploited. 

It followed that where a corporation cannot take an opportunity because (1) it has no money (2) it has a different business, and/or (3) it has not "interest or reasonable expectancy" in taking the opportunity, then a director will be found to have legitimately taken an opportunity for itself. Layton felt that there was no real standard for loyalty and it depends on the facts of the case. The court may enquire and will decide upon the fairness of any transaction.

Significance
This has been followed in the Delaware General Corporation Law §144, although authorities differ as to whether §144 covers the Guth v. Loft situation.

Notes

References
David Kershaw, 'Does it matter how the Law Thinks About Corporate Opportunities?' (2005) 25:4 Legal Studies 533
John Lowry and Rod Edmunds, 'The No Conflict-No Profit Rules and the Corporate Fiduciary-Challenging the Orthodoxy of Absolutism' [2000] Journal of Business Law 122-142
V. Brudney and R. C. Clark, "A New Look at Corporate Opportunities" (1981) 94 Harvard Law Review 997

United States corporate case law
Delaware state case law
1939 in United States case law
1939 in Delaware
PepsiCo